Agdistis parvella is a moth in the family Pterophoridae. It is known from Saudi Arabia, Oman and Iran.

References

Agdistinae
Moths described in 1958
Moths of the Middle East
Insects of Iran